Ji Liping (born ) is a retired Chinese female volleyball player.

She was part of the China women's national volleyball team at the 1994 FIVB Volleyball Women's World Championship in Brazil. On club level she played with Sichuan.

Clubs
  Sichuan (1994)

References

1968 births
Living people
Chinese women's volleyball players
Place of birth missing (living people)
Asian Games medalists in volleyball
Volleyball players at the 1994 Asian Games
Medalists at the 1994 Asian Games
Asian Games silver medalists for China
20th-century Chinese women